Suman Ramesh Tulsiani Technical Campus-Faculty of Engineering is an engineering college in Kamshet, Pune, Maharashtra, India. The college is approved by AICTE New Delhi and affiliated by Savitribai Phule Pune University and MSBTE. The institute is accredited by NAAC with 'B+' grade. The Institute has been established under the Academic and Administrative control of Vishwakarma Institutes.

Courses

Undergraduate
All Bachelor of Engineering/Technology (B.E.) courses are for a duration of four years. The following courses are offered:
 Computer Engineering
 AI & DS
 Mechanical Engineering

Sister Institutes
 Vishwakarma Institute of Information Technology
 Vishwakarma University
 Vishwakarma Institute of Technology
 Vishwakarma Institute of Management

Professional Chapters
 National Programme on Technology Enhanced Learning (NPTEL)
 The Indian Society for Technical Education (ISTE)
 Computer Society of India
 National Service Scheme
 SAEINDIA
 Quality Circle Forum of India
 Entrepreneur Development Cell

Industry Advisory Board
 Computer IAB
 Civil IAB
 Mechanical IAB

Facilities
 NPTEL Video
 Digital Library DELNET
 Gym
 Basket court
 Online student's fee payment
 Free Wi-fi
 Sports facility
 Bus Facility from Aundh, Bhosari, Khopoli, Lonavala, Katraj, Kamshet Station
 Hostel
 36 Mbps Internet Leased Line
 Reprographic Facility
 260 kVA Back-up Generator
 Doctor on call
 Library
 Vehicle parking
 Computer Centre
 Telephone
 Filtered drinking water
 Seminar halls

Extension activities
 Laxmi Sharda Skills courses under PMKVY
 Yashwantrao Chavan Maharashtra Open University (YCMoU) Courses

Extra-curricular activities

SRTTC-FoE organizes an annual social gathering, "Sneh-Suman", every year. Also, the institute witnesses a major event of MSBTE's Zonal Level Weightlifting Championship-2014, where near about 100 students participated from Pune region.

Team Agneya Racing participated at Lovely Professional University, October 2018.

Student organizations and clubs
 Mechanical Engineering Student Association (MESA)
 Civil Engineering Student Association (CESA)
 Computer Society of India

References

External links
https://www.facebook.com/SRTTCFoE
http://www.srttc.ac.in
http://www.vit.edu
http://www.unipune.ac.in/

Engineering colleges in Pune
Engineering colleges in Maharashtra